The 2014 Seattle Mariners season was the 38th season in franchise history. The Mariners played their 15th full season (16th overall) at Safeco Field. They were competitive all season and were not eliminated from post-season contention until the last day of the season, finishing with a respectable 87–75 record and third place in the AL West.

Standings

American League West

American League Wild Card

Record against opponents

Game log

|-  style="text-align:center; background:#bfb;"
| 1 || March 31 || @ Angels  || 10–3 || Hernández (1–0) || Weaver (0–1) || — || 44,152 || 1–0 || 
|-  style="text-align:center; background:#bfb;"
| 2 || April 1 || @ Angels  || 8–3 || Ramírez (1–0) || Wilson (0–1) || — || 43,567 || 2–0 || 
|-  style="text-align:center; background:#bfb;"
| 3 || April 2 || @ Angels  || 8–2 || Paxton (1–0) || Santiago (0–1) || — || 38,007 || 3–0 || 
|-  style="text-align:center; background:#ffbbbb"
| 4 || April 3 || @ Athletics  || 2–3 (12) || Pomeranz (1–0) || Noesí (0–1) || — || 11,236 || 3–1 || 
|-  style="text-align:center; background:#bbbbbb"
| – || April 4 || @ Athletics  || colspan=7| PPD, FIELD CONDITIONS; Rescheduled for May 7
|-  style="text-align:center; background:#bfb"
| 5 || April 5 || @ Athletics  || 3–1 || Hernández (2–0) || Straily (0–1) || Rodney (1) || 30,290 || 4–1 || 
|-  style="text-align:center; background:#ffbbbb"
| 6 || April 6 || @ Athletics  || 3–6 || Gray (1–0) || Ramirez (1–1) || Johnson (1) || 32,852 || 4–2 || 
|-  style="text-align:center; background:#bfb"
| 7 || April 8 || Angels  || 5–3 || Paxton (2–0) || Santiago (0–2) || Rodney (2) || 45,661 || 5–2 || 
|-  style="text-align:center; background:#ffbbbb"
| 8 || April 9 || Angels  || 0–2 || Richards (2–0) || Elias (0–1) || Frieri (1) || 16,437 || 5–3 || 
|-  style="text-align:center; background:#bfb"
| 9 || April 11 || Athletics  || 6–4 || Hernández (3–0) || Milone (0–1) || Rodney (3) || 38,968 || 6–3 || 
|-  style="text-align:center; background:#ffbbbb"
| 10 || April 12 || Athletics  || 1–3 || Gray (2–0) || Ramirez (1–2) || Gregerson (1) || 22,061 || 6–4 || 
|-  style="text-align:center; background:#ffbbbb"
| 11 || April 13 || Athletics  || 0–3 || Otero (2–0) || Furbush (0–1) || Doolittle (1) || 22,628 || 6–5 || 
|-  style="text-align:center; background:#bfb"
| 12 || April 14 || @ Rangers  || 7–1 || Elias (1–1) || Lewis (0–1) || — || 23,081 || 7–5 ||
|-  style="text-align:center; background:#ffbbbb"
| 13 || April 15 || @ Rangers  || 0–5 || Ross (1–0) || Beavan (0–1) || — || 26,628 || 7–6 ||  
|-  style="text-align:center; background:#ffbbbb"
| 14 || April 16 || @ Rangers  || 2–3 || Figueroa (1–1) || Rodney (0–1) || — || 27,396 || 7–7 ||  
|-  style="text-align:center; background:#ffbbbb"
| 15 || April 17 || @ Rangers  || 6–8 || Figueroa (2–1) || Beimel (0–1) || Soria (2) || 29,024 || 7–8 ||
|-  style="text-align:center; background:#ffbbbb"
| 16 || April 18 || @ Marlins  || 4–8 || Cishek (1–0) || Medina (0–1) || — || 21,388 || 7–9 ||    
|-  style="text-align:center; background:#ffbbbb"
| 17 || April 19 || @ Marlins  || 0–7 || Álvarez (1–2) || Elias (1–2) || — || 24,003 || 7–10 ||   
|-  style="text-align:center; background:#ffbbbb"
| 18 || April 20 || @ Marlins  || 2–3 || Dunn (1–2) || Wilhelmsen (0–1) || Cishek (3) || 20,228 || 7–11 ||  
|-  style="text-align:center; background:#ffbbbb"
| 19 || April 21 || Astros  || 2–7 || Keuchel (2–1) || Hernández (3–1) || — || 14,630 || 7–12 ||    
|-  style="text-align:center; background:#ffbbbb"
| 20 || April 22 || Astros  || 2–5 || McHugh (1–0) || Ramirez (1–3) || Fields (2) || 10,466 || 7–13 || 
|-  style="text-align:center; background:#bfb"
| 21 || April 23 || Astros  || 5–3 || Rodney (1–1) || Fields (0–1) || — || 13,739 || 8–13 ||   
|-  style="text-align:center; background:#bfb"
| 22 || April 25 || Rangers  || 6–5 || Medina (1–1) || Cotts (1–2) || Rodney (4) || 31,145 || 9–13 ||     
|-  style="text-align:center; background:#ffbbbb"
| 23 || April 26 || Rangers  || 3–6 || Poreda (1–0) || Furbush (0–2) || Soria (6) || 30,038 || 9–14 ||   
|-  style="text-align:center; background:#bfb"
| 24 || April 27 || Rangers  || 6–5 || Farquhar (1–0) || Ogando (1–2) || Rodney (5) || 26,300 || 10–14 ||   
|-  style="text-align:center; background:#bfb"
| 25 || April 29 || @ Yankees  || 6–3 || Young (1–0) || Sabathia (3–3) || — || 37,484 || 11–14 ||   
|-  style="text-align:center; background:#bbbbbb"
| – || April 30 || @ Yankees  || colspan=7| PPD, RAIN; Rescheduled for June 2 
|-

|-  style="text-align:center; background:#bfb"
| 26 || May 1 || @ Yankees  || 4–2 || Elias (2–2) || Kuroda (2–3) || Rodney (6) || 43,121 || 12–14 ||  
|-  style="text-align:center; background:#ffbbbb"
| 27 || May 2 || @ Astros  || 4–5 (11)  || Bass (1–0) || Furbush (0–3) || — || 15,771 || 12–15 ||  
|-  style="text-align:center; background:#bfb"
| 28 || May 3 || @ Astros  || 9–8 || Iwakuma (1–0) || Keuchel (2–2) || Rodney (7) || 15,798 || 13–15 ||
|-  style="text-align:center; background:#bfb"
| 29 || May 4 || @ Astros  || 8–7 || Maurer (1–0) || McHugh (2–1) || Farquhar (1) || 24,996 || 14–15 ||
|-  style="text-align:center; background:#bfb"
| 30 || May 5 || @ Athletics  || 4–2 || Young (2–0) || Kazmir (4–1) || Rodney (8) || 11,019 || 15–15 ||
|-  style="text-align:center; background:#bfb"
| 31 || May 6 || @ Athletics  || 8–3 || Elias (3–2) || Chavez (2–1) || — || 12,106 || 16–15 ||
|-  style="text-align:center; background:#bfb"
| 32 || May 7 || @ Athletics  || 6–4 (10) || Medina (2–1)|| Cook (0–1) || Rodney (9) || 17,337 || 17–15 ||
|-  style="text-align:center; background:#ffbbbb"
| 33 || May 7 || @ Athletics  || 0–2 || Pomeranz (2–1) || Ramirez (1–4) || Johnson (2) || 17,337 || 17–16 ||
|-  style="text-align:center; background:#bfb"
| 34 || May 8 || Royals  || 1–0 || Iwakuma (2–0) || Duffy (1–3) || Rodney (10) || 12,577 || 18–16 ||
|-  style="text-align:center; background:#ffbbbb"
| 35 || May 9 || Royals  || 1–6 || Vargas (3–1) || Maurer (1–1) || — || 20,858 || 18–17 ||
|-  style="text-align:center; background:#bfb"
| 36 || May 10 || Royals  || 3–1 || Young (3–0) || Ventura (2–2) || Rodney (11) || 29,359 || 19–17 ||
|-  style="text-align:center; background:#ffbbbb"
| 37 || May 11 || Royals  || 7–9 || Coleman (1–0) || Farquhar (1–1) || Holland (9) || 30,447 || 19–18 ||
|-  style="text-align:center; background:#bfb"
| 38 || May 12 || Rays  || 12–5 || Hernández (4–1) || Ramos (1–2) || — || 12,392 || 20–18 ||
|-  style="text-align:center; background:#ffbbbb"
| 39 || May 13 || Rays  || 1–2 || Price (4–3) || Rodney (1–2) || — || 13,446 || 20–19 ||
|-  style="text-align:center; background:#ffbbbb"
| 40 || May 14 || Rays  || 0–2 || Odorizzi (2–3) || Maurer (1–2) || Balfour (7) || 20,951 || 20–20 ||
|-  style="text-align:center; background:#ffbbbb"
| 41 || May 16 || @ Twins  || 4–5 || Gibson (4–3) || Young (3–1) || Perkins (11) || 27,275 || 20–21 ||
|-  style="text-align:center; background:#ffbbbb"
| 42 || May 17 || @ Twins  || 3–4 || Deduno (1–2) || Elias (3–3) || Perkins (12) || 29,717 || 20–22 ||
|-  style="text-align:center; background:#bfb"
| 43 || May 18 || @ Twins  || 6–2 || Hernández (5–1) || Nolasco (2–4) || — || 32,511 || 21–22 || 
|-  style="text-align:center; background:#bfb"
| 44 || May 20 || @ Rangers  || 6–2 || Iwakuma (3–0) || Lewis (3–3) || — || 43,706 || 22–22 || 
|-  style="text-align:center; background:#ffbbbb"
| 45 || May 21 || @ Rangers  || 3–4 || Tepesch (1–0) || Young (3–2) || Soria (8) || 43,654 || 22–23 ||
|-  style="text-align:center; background:#bfb"
| 46 || May 22 || Astros  || 3–1 || Leone (1–0) || Cosart (3–4) || Rodney (12) || 13,836 || 23–23 ||  
|-  style="text-align:center; background:#bfb"
| 47 || May 23 || Astros  || 6–1 || Hernández (6–1) || Owens (0–1) || — || 21,192 || 24–23 ||  
|-  style="text-align:center; background:#ffbbbb"
| 48 || May 24 || Astros  || 4–9 || Oberholtzer (1–6) || Maurer (1–3) || — || 21,585 || 24–24 ||  
|-  style="text-align:center; background:#ffbbbb"
| 49 || May 25 || Astros  || 1–4 || Keuchel (6–2) || Iwakuma (3–1) || — || 26,839 || 24–25 ||  
|-  style="text-align:center; background:#bfb"
| 50 || May 26 || Angels  || 5–1 || Young (4–2) || Skaggs (4–2) || — || 22,710 || 25–25 ||  
|-  style="text-align:center; background:#ffbbbb"
| 51 || May 27 || Angels  || 4–6 || Weaver (6–3) || Elias (3–4) || Frieri (7) || 13,064 || 25–26 || 
|-  style="text-align:center; background:#bfb"
| 52 || May 28 || Angels  || 3–1 || Hernández (7–1) || Wilson (6–4) || Rodney (13) || 13,895 || 26–26 || 
|-  style="text-align:center; background:#ffbbbb"
| 53 || May 29 || Angels  || 5–7 || Shoemaker (3–1) || Maurer (1–4) || Frieri (8) || 11,657 || 26–27 || 
|-  style="text-align:center; background:#ffbbbb"
| 54 || May 30 || Tigers  || 3–6 || Verlander (6–4) || Iwakuma (3–2) || Chamberlain (2) || 29,000 || 26–28 || 
|-  style="text-align:center; background:#bfb"
| 55 || May 31 || Tigers  || 3–2 || Young (5–2) || Smyly (2–4) || Rodney (14) || 37,142 || 27–28 || 
|-

|-  style="text-align:center; background:#bfb"
| 56 || June 1 || Tigers  || 4–0 || Elias (4–4) || Scherzer (6–2) || — || 31,407 || 28–28 ||
|-  style="text-align:center; background:#bfb"
| 57 || June 2 || @ Yankees  || 10–2 || Hernández (8–1) || Phelps (1–3) || — || 41,539 || 29–28 ||   
|-  style="text-align:center; background:#bfb"
| 58 || June 3 || @ Braves || 7–5 || Leone (2–0) || Wood (5–6) || Rodney (15) || 36,503 || 30–28 ||   
|-  style="text-align:center; background:#bfb"
| 59 || June 4 || @ Braves  || 2–0 || Iwakuma (4–2) || Minor (2–4) || Rodney (16) || 26,960 || 31–28 || 
|-  style="text-align:center; background:#ffbbbb"
| 60 || June 6 || @ Rays  || 0–4 || Bédard (3–4) || Young (5–3) || — || 14,577 || 31–29 || 
|-  style="text-align:center; background:#bfb"
| 61 || June 7 || @ Rays  || 7–4 || Elias (5–4) || Cobb (1–4) || Rodney (17) || 23,996 || 32–29 || 
|-  style="text-align:center; background:#bfb"
| 62 || June 8 || @ Rays  || 5–0 || Medina (3–1) || Balfour (0–2) || — || 18,158 || 33–29 || 
|-  style="text-align:center; background:#bfb"
| 63 || June 9 || @ Rays  || 3–0 || Beimel (1–1) || Price (4–6) || Rodney (18) || 10,400 || 34–29 || 
|-  style="text-align:center; background:#ffbbbb"
| 64 || June 10 || Yankees  || 2–3 || Betances (4–0) || Iwakuma (4–3) || Robertson (15) || 28,405 || 34–30 || 
|-  style="text-align:center; background:#ffbbbb"
| 65 || June 11 || Yankees  || 2–4 || Tanaka (10–1) || Young (5–4) || — || 28,434 || 34–31 || 
|-  style="text-align:center; background:#ffbbbb"
| 66 || June 12 || Yankees  || 3–6 || Whitley (2–0) || Elias (5–5) || Robertson (16) || 40,596 || 34–32 || 
|-  style="text-align:center; background:#ffbbbb"
| 67 || June 13 || Rangers  || 0–1 || Tolleson (2–1) || Hernández (8–2) || Soria (14) || 22,039 || 34–33 || 
|-  style="text-align:center; background:#ffbbbb"
| 68 || June 14 || Rangers  || 3–4 || Cotts (2–3) || Rodney (1–3) || Soria (15) || 27,700 || 34–34 || 
|-  style="text-align:center; background:#bfb"
| 69 || June 15 || Rangers  || 5–1 || Iwakuma (5–3) || Martinez (1–4) || — || 39,196 || 35–34 || 
|-  style="text-align:center; background:#bfb"
| 70 || June 16 || Padres  || 5–1 || Young (6–4) || Ross (6–6) || — || 17,512 || 36–34 || 
|-  style="text-align:center; background:#bfb"
| 71 || June 17 || Padres  || 6–1 || Elias (6–5) || Stults (2–9) || — || 19,896 || 37–34 || 
|-  style="text-align:center; background:#ffbbbb"
| 72 || June 18 || @ Padres  || 1–2 || Benoit (3–0) || Furbush (0–4) || Street (19) || 27,523 || 37–35 || 
|-  style="text-align:center; background:#ffbbbb"
| 73 || June 19 || @ Padres  || 1–4 || Hahn (2–1) || Leone (2–1) || Street (20) || 18,755 || 37–36 || 
|-  style="text-align:center; background:#bfb"
| 74 || June 20 || @ Royals  || 7–5 || Furbush (1–4) || Holland (0–2) || Rodney (19) || 38,475 || 38–36 || 
|-  style="text-align:center; background:#bfb"
| 75 || June 21 || @ Royals  || 2–1 || Medina (4–1) || Vargas (7–3) || Rodney (20) || 21,640 || 39–36 || 
|-  style="text-align:center; background:#bfb"
| 76 || June 22 || @ Royals  || 2–1 || Elias (7–5) || Ventura (5–6) || Rodney (21) || 23,278 || 40–36 || 
|-  style="text-align:center; background:#bfb"
| 77 || June 23 || Red Sox  || 12–3 || Hernández (9–2) || Lackey (8–5) || — || 26,860 || 41–36 || 
|-  style="text-align:center; background:#bfb"
| 78 || June 24 || Red Sox  || 8–2 || Beimel (2–1) || Peavy (1–6) || — || 20,015 || 42–36 || 
|-  style="text-align:center; background:#ffbbbb"
| 79 || June 25 || Red Sox  || 4–5 || Buchholz (3–4) || Iwakuma (5–4) || Uehara (16) || 27,333 || 42–37 || 
|-  style="text-align:center; background:#bfb"
| 80 || June 27 || Indians  || 3–2 || Young (7–4) || Bauer (2–4) || Rodney (22) || 28,084 || 43–37 || 
|-  style="text-align:center; background:#ffbbbb"
| 81 || June 28 || Indians  || 0–5 || Tomlin (5–5) || Elias (7–6) || — || 23,012 || 43–38 || 
|-  style="text-align:center; background:#bfb"
| 82 || June 29 || Indians  || 3–0 || Hernández (10–2) || House (0–2) || Rodney (23) || 26,171 || 44–38 || 
|-  style="text-align:center; background:#bfb"
| 83 || June 30 || @ Astros  || 10–4 || Walker (1–0) || McHugh (4–7) || Wilhelmsen (1) || 17,340 || 45–38 || 
|-

|-  style="text-align:center; background:#bfb"
| 84 || July 1 || @ Astros  || 13–2 || Iwakuma (6–4) || Cosart (8–6) || — || 17,504 || 46–38 || 
|-  style="text-align:center; background:#bfb"
| 85 || July 2 || @ Astros  || 5–2 || Young (8–4) || Peacock (2–5) || Rodney (24) || 17,209 || 47–38 ||
|-  style="text-align:center; background:#ffbbbb"
| 86 || July 4 || @ White Sox  || 1–7 || Sale (8–1) || Elias (7–7) || — || 30,297 || 47–39 ||  
|-  style="text-align:center; background:#bfb"
| 87 || July 5 || @ White Sox  || 3–2 (14) || Wilhelmsen (1–1) || Belisario (3–5) || Rodney (25) || 23,113 || 48–39 ||
|-  style="text-align:center; background:#ffbbbb"
| 88 || July 6 || @ White Sox  || 0–1 || Noesí (3–6) || Walker (1–1) || Petricka (3) || 23,370 || 48–40 ||
|-  style="text-align:center; background:#bfb"
| 89 || July 7 || Twins  || 2–0 || Iwakuma (7–4) || Correia (4–11) || Rodney (26) || 18,562 || 49–40 ||
|-  style="text-align:center; background:#ffbbbb"
| 90 || July 8 || Twins  || 0–2 || Hughes (9–5) || Young (8–5) || Perkins (21) || 15,553 || 49–41 ||
|-  style="text-align:center; background:#ffbbbb"
| 91 || July 9 || Twins  || 1–8 || Gibson (8–7) || Elias (7–8) || — || 16,460 || 49–42 ||
|-  style="text-align:center; background:#ffbbbb"
| 92 || July 10 || Twins  || 2–4 || Pino (1–2) || Wilhelmsen (1–2) || Perkins (22) || 14,530 || 49–43 ||
|-  style="text-align:center; background:#bfb"
| 93 || July 11 || Athletics  || 3–2 || Hernández (11–2) || Samardzija (3–8) || Rodney (27) || 32,971 || 50–43 ||
|-  style="text-align:center; background:#bfb"
| 94 || July 12 || Athletics  || 6–2 || Iwakuma (8–4) || Chavez (7–6) || — || 39,204 || 51–43 ||
|-  style="text-align:center; background:#ffbbbb"
| 95 || July 13 || Athletics  || 1–4 || Gray (10–3) || Young (8–6) || Doolittle (14) || 25,944 || 51–44 ||
|-  style="text-align:center; background:#ffbbbb"
| 96 || July 18 || @ Angels  || 2–3 (16) || Santiago (2–7) || Leone (2–2) || — || 42,517 || 51–45 ||
|-  style="text-align:center; background:#bfb"
| 97 || July 19 || @ Angels  || 3–2 (12) || Leone (3–2) || Thatcher (1–1) || Furbush (1) || 40,231 || 52–45 ||
|-  style="text-align:center; background:#ffbbbb"
| 98 || July 20 || @ Angels  || 5–6 || Thatcher (2–1) || Rodney (1–4) || — || 37,128 || 52–46 ||
|-  style="text-align:center; background:#bfb"
| 99 || July 21 || Mets  || 5–2 || Elias (8–8) || Niese (5–5) || — || 21,943 || 53–46 ||
|-  style="text-align:center; background:#ffbbbb"
| 100 || July 22 || Mets  || 1–3 || deGrom (4–5) || Ramirez (1–5) || Mejía (12) || 18,681 || 53–47 ||
|-  style="text-align:center; background:#ffbbbb"
| 101 || July 23 || Mets  || 2–3 || Colón (9–8) || Walker (1–2) || Mejía (13) || 36,224 || 53–48 ||
|-  style="text-align:center; background:#ffbbbb"
| 102 || July 24 || Orioles  || 0–4 || Chen (11–3) || Iwakuma (8–5) || — || 19,621 || 53–49 ||
|-  style="text-align:center; background:#ffbbbb"
| 103 || July 25 || Orioles  || 1–2 (10) || O'Day (3–1) || Furbush (1–5) || Britton (19) || 34,792 || 53–50 ||
|-  style="text-align:center; background:#bfb"
| 104 || July 26 || Orioles  || 4–3 || Young (9–6) || Norris (8–7) || Rodney (28) || 36,936 || 54–50 ||
|-  style="text-align:center; background:#ffbbbb"
| 105 || July 27 || Orioles  || 2–3 (10) || McFarland (4–2) || Medina (4–2) || Britton (20) || 26,523 || 54–51 ||
|-  style="text-align:center; background:#bfb"
| 106 || July 29 || @ Indians  || 5–2 || Iwakuma (9–5) || Bauer (4–6) || Rodney (29) || 15,713 || 55–51 ||
|-  style="text-align:center; background:#fbb;"
| 107 || July 30 || @ Indians  || 0–2 || Kluber (11–6) || Hernández (11–3) || — || 14,863 || 55–52 ||
|-  style="text-align:center; background:#bfb"
| 108 || July 31 || @ Indians  || 6–5 || Beimel (3–1) || Shaw (4–3) || Rodney (30) || 16,336 || 56–52 ||
|-

|-  style="text-align:center; background:#ffbbbb"
| 109 || August 1 || @ Orioles  || 1–2 ||  Chen (12–3) || Elias (8–9) || Britton (22) || 39,487 || 56–53 || 
|-  style="text-align:center; background:#bfb"
| 110 || August 2 || @ Orioles  || 6–3  || Leone (4–2) || González (5–6) || — || 36,508 || 57–53 ||
|-  style="text-align:center; background:#ffbbbb"
| 111 || August 3 || @ Orioles  || 0–1 || Tillman (8–5) || Iwakuma (9–6) || Britton (23) || 35,217 || 57–54 ||
|-  style="text-align:center; background:#bfb"
| 112 || August 5 || Braves  || 4–2 || Hernández (12–3) || Wood (7–9) || Rodney (31) || 24,496 || 58–54 ||
|-  style="text-align:center; background:#bfb"
| 113 || August 6 || Braves  || 7–3 || Young (10–6) || Teherán (10–8) || — || 30,770 || 59–54 ||
|-  style="text-align:center; background:#bfb"
| 114 || August 7 || White Sox  || 13–3 || Elias (9–9) || Carroll (4–7) || — || 18,740 || 60–54 ||
|-  style="text-align:center; background:#bfb"
| 115 || August 8 || White Sox  || 4–1 || Iwakuma (10–6) || Quintana (6–8) || Rodney (32) || 23,223 || 61–54 ||
|-  style="text-align:center; background:#ffbbbb"
| 116 || August 9 || White Sox  || 1–2 (10) || Surkamp (1–0) || Rodney (1–5) || Petricka (8) || 40,122 || 61–55 ||
|-  style="text-align:center; background:#bfb"
| 117 || August 10 || White Sox  || 4–2 || Leone (5–2) || Danks (9–8) || Rodney (33) || 27,236 || 62–55 ||
|-  style="text-align:center; background:#bfb"
| 118 || August 11 || Blue Jays  || 11–1 || Hernández (13–3) || Hutchison (8–10) || — || 41,168 || 63–55 ||
|-  style="text-align:center; background:#bfb"
| 119 || August 12 || Blue Jays  || 6–3 || Young (11–6) || Happ (8–7) || Rodney (34) || 26,076 || 64–55 ||
|-  style="text-align:center; background:#bfb"
| 120 || August 13 || Blue Jays  || 2–0 || Iwakuma (11–6) || Dickey (9–12) || Rodney (35) || 32,368 || 65–55 ||
|-  style="text-align:center; background:#bfb"
| 121 || August 15 || @ Tigers  || 7–2 || Paxton (3–0) || Porcello (13–8) || — || 42,385 || 66–55 ||
|-  style="text-align:center; background:#ffbbbb"
| 122 || August 16 || @ Tigers  || 2–4 || Price (12–8) || Hernández (13–4) || Nathan (25) || 43,833 || 66–56 ||
|-  style="text-align:center; background:#bfb"
| 123 || August 17 || @ Tigers  || 8–1 || Young (12–6) || Ray (1–3) || — || 41,181 || 67–56 ||
|-  style="text-align:center; background:#ffbbbb"
| 124 || August 18 || @ Phillies  || 1–4 || Williams (3–5) || Elias (9–10) || Papelbon (29) || 28,102 || 67–57 ||
|-  style="text-align:center; background:#bfb"
| 125 || August 19 || @ Phillies  || 5–2 || Iwakuma (12–6) || Burnett (6–14) || Rodney (36) || 31,592 || 68–57 ||
|-  style="text-align:center; background:#ffbbbb"
| 126 || August 20 || @ Phillies  || 3–4 || Hamels (7–6) || Paxton (3–1) || Papelbon (30) || 25,157 || 68–58 ||
|-  style="text-align:center; background:#bfb"
| 127 || August 22 || @ Red Sox  || 5–3 || Leone (6–2) || Uehara (5–4) || Rodney (37) || 36,433 || 69–58 ||
|-  style="text-align:center; background:#bfb"
| 128 || August 23 || @ Red Sox  || 7–3 || Wilhelmsen (2–2) || Workman (1–8) || — || 36,905 || 70–58 ||
|-  style="text-align:center; background:#bfb"
| 129 || August 24 || @ Red Sox  || 8–6 || Leone (7–2) || Webster (3–2) || Rodney (38) || 37,022 || 71–58 ||
|-  style="text-align:center; background:#ffbbbb"
| 130 || August 25 || Rangers  || 0–2 || Mikolas (2–5) || Elias (9–11) || Feliz (7) || 21,620 || 71–59 ||
|-  style="text-align:center; background:#bfb"
| 131 || August 26 || Rangers  || 5–0 || Paxton (4–1) || Martinez (3–10) || — || 20,469 || 72–59 ||
|-  style="text-align:center; background:#ffbbbb"
| 132 || August 27 || Rangers  || 4–12 || Lewis (9–11) || Ramirez (1–6) || — || 29,463 || 72–60 ||
|-  style="text-align:center; background:#ffbbbb"
| 133 || August 29 || Nationals  || 3–8 || Zimmermann (10–5) || Hernández (13–5) || — || 35,616 || 72–61 ||
|-  style="text-align:center; background:#ffbbbb"
| 134 || August 30 || Nationals  || 1–3 || Strasburg (11–10) || Elias (9–12) || Soriano (30) || 32,894 || 72–62 ||
|-  style="text-align:center; background:#bfb"
| 135 || August 31 || Nationals  || 5–3 || Iwakuma (13–6) || Roark (12–9) || Rodney (39) || 26,221 || 73–62 ||
|-

|-  style="text-align:center; background:#ffbbbb"
| 136 || September 1 || @ Athletics  || 1–6 || Hammel (10–10) || Young (12–7) || — || 36,067 || 73–63 ||
|-  style="text-align:center; background:#bfb"
| 137 || September 2 || @ Athletics  || 6–5 || Paxton (5–1) || Gray (13–8) || Rodney (40) || 23,859 || 74–63 ||
|-  style="text-align:center; background:#bfb"
| 138 || September 3 || @ Athletics  || 2–1 || Hernández (14–5) || Lester (13–10) || Rodney (41) || 17,073 || 75–63 ||
|-  style="text-align:center; background:#bfb"
| 139 || September 4 || @ Rangers  || 10–2 || Elias (10–12) || Ross (2–6) || — || 26,965 || 76–63 ||
|-  style="text-align:center; background:#bfb"
| 140 || September 5 || @ Rangers  || 7–5 || Iwakuma (14–6) || Baker (3–4) || Rodney (42) || 23,428 || 77–63 ||
|-  style="text-align:center; background:#bfb"
| 141 || September 6 || @ Rangers  || 4–2 || Farquhar (2–1) || Cotts (2–9) || Rodney (43) || 29,552 || 78–63 ||
|-  style="text-align:center; background:#ffbbbb"
| 142 || September 7 || @ Rangers  || 0–1 || Holland (1–0) || Paxton (5–2) || Feliz (8) || 26,851 || 78–64 ||
|-  style="text-align:center; background:#bfb"
| 143 || September 8 || Astros  || 4–1 || Farquhar (3–1) || Foltynewicz (0–1) || Rodney (44) || 15,617 || 79–64 ||
|-  style="text-align:center; background:#ffbbbb"
| 144 || September 9 || Astros  || 1–2 || McHugh (9–9) || Medina (4–3) || Fields (4) || 11,345 || 79–65 ||
|-  style="text-align:center; background:#ffbbbb"
| 145 || September 10 || Astros  || 2–5 || Tropeano (1–0) || Iwakuma (14–7) || Sipp (4) || 16,931 || 79–66 ||
|-  style="text-align:center; background:#bfb"
| 146 || September 12 || Athletics  || 4–2 || Paxton (6–2) || Hammel (10–11) || Rodney (45) || 29,090 || 80–66 ||
|-  style="text-align:center; background:#ffbbbb"
| 147 || September 13 || Athletics  || 2–3 (10) || Gregerson (5–4) || Rodney (1–6) || Doolittle (21) || 43,913 || 80–67 ||
|-  style="text-align:center; background:#ffbbbb"
| 148 || September 14 || Athletics  || 0–4 || Lester (15–10) || Young (12–8) || — || 28,925 || 80–68 ||
|-  style="text-align:center; background:#ffbbbb"
| 149 || September 15 || @ Angels  || 1–8 || Shoemaker (16–4) || Iwakuma (14–8) || — || 36,137 || 80–69 ||
|-  style="text-align:center; background:#bfb"
| 150 || September 16 || @ Angels  || 13–2 || Smith (1–0) || Grilli (1–5) || — || 36,193 || 81–69 ||
|-  style="text-align:center; background:#ffbbbb"
| 151 || September 17 || @ Angels  || 0–5 || Wilson (13–9) || Paxton (6–3) || — || 36,875 || 81–70 ||
|-  style="text-align:center; background:#bfb"
| 152 || September 18 || @ Angels  || 3–1 || Wilhelmsen (3–2) || Jepsen (0–2) || Rodney (46) || 40,835 || 82–70 ||
|-  style="text-align:center; background:#bfb"
| 153 || September 19 || @ Astros  || 10–5 || Walker (2–2) || Peacock (4–9) || — || 27,568 || 83–70 ||
|-  style="text-align:center; background:#ffbbbb"
| 154 || September 20 || @ Astros  || 1–10 || Keuchel (12–9) || Young (12–9) || — || 36,525 || 83–71 ||
|-  style="text-align:center; background:#ffbbbb"
| 155 || September 21 || @ Astros  || 3–8 || McHugh (11–9) || Iwakuma (14–9) || — || 31,466 || 83–72 ||
|-  style="text-align:center; background:#ffbbbb"
| 156 || September 22 || @ Blue Jays  || 4–14 || Happ (10–11) || Paxton (6–4) || — || 15,548 || 83–73 ||
|-  style="text-align:center; background:#ffbbbb"
| 157 || September 23 || @ Blue Jays  || 2–10 || Dickey (14–12) || Hernández (14–6) || — || 16,272 || 83–74 ||
|-  style="text-align:center; background:#ffbbbb"
| 158 || September 24 || @ Blue Jays  || 0–1 || Buehrle (13–10) || Walker (2–3) || Sanchez (3) || 16,836 || 83–75 ||
|-  style="text-align:center; background:#bfb"
| 159 || September 25 || @ Blue Jays  || 7–5 || Medina (5–3) || Loup (4–4) || Rodney (47) || 17,173 || 84–75 ||
|-  style="text-align:center; background:#bfb"
| 160 || September 26 || Angels  || 4–3 || Iwakuma (15–9) || Weaver (18–9) || Rodney (48) || 26,865 || 85–75 ||
|-  style="text-align:center; background:#bfb"
| 161 || September 27 || Angels  || 2–1 (11) || Leone (8–2) || Morin (4–4) || — || 32,716 || 86–75 ||
|-  style="text-align:center; background:#bfb"
| 162 || September 28 || Angels  || 4–1 || Hernández (15–6) || Rasmus (3–2) || — || 40,823 || 87–75 ||
|-

Roster

Players stats

Batting

Note: G = Games played; AB = At bats; R = Runs scored; H = Hits; 2B = Doubles; 3B = Triples; HR = Home runs; RBI = Runs batted in; BB = Base on balls; SO = Strikeouts; SB = Stolen bases; CS = Caught stealing; AVG = Batting average

Pitching

Note: W = Wins; L = Losses; ERA = Earned run average; G = Games pitched; GS = Games started; SV = Saves; SVO = Save Opportunities; IP = Innings pitched; H = Hits allowed; ER = Earned runs allowed; HR = Home runs allowed; BB = Walks allowed;  SO = Strikeouts

Fielding

Note: G = Games played; INN = Innings played; TC = Total chances; A = Total assists; E = Total errors committed; SB = Stolen bases allowed; CS = Caught stealing; PB = Passed balls; FPCT = Average of errors per total chances

Farm system

References

External links

2014 Seattle Mariners season at Baseball Reference

Seattle Mariners seasons
Seattle Mariners season
Seattle Mariners
Seattle Mariners